The Railway Museum of Catalonia is a museum in Vilanova i la Geltrú (Catalonia, Spain). The museum has a large collection of historic railway locomotives and other rolling stock in a former station and roundhouse. It is located close to the railway station in Vilanova i la Geltrú, 40 km south of Barcelona.

History

The museum opened in 1990 and is located in a former engine shed, built at the end of the 19th century. About 900 workers repaired and maintained locomotives there until 1967, when these activities ceased.

The main building, attached to the museum, contains a library and a collection of railway items such as caps, miniatures, and machinery. The museum also has an auditorium where a film about the history of the railway in Catalonia is shown daily. The reception where visitors enter is the original ticket office from a railway station in the village of La Granada.

In 1972, MOROP, an association that federates national associations of railroad and model railroad enthusiasts, held their nineteenth congress in Barcelona. The antique locomotives displayed at the congress were stored in the facilities that would later house the museum. In 1981, the centenary of the commercial rail line between Barcelona and Vilanova, the creation of a Railway Museum in the old engine shed was proposed. The national Spanish railway operator (RENFE) and the autonomous government of Catalonia initially led the project. Later the town council of Vilanova joined.

The museum opened on August 5, 1990. In 1993 RENFE the National Spanish Railways made the Vilanova museum a subsidiary of the main museum in Madrid, the Museo del Ferrocarril de Madrid, and the   In 2010 the Universitat Politècnica de Catalunya established a master's program on Railway systems and Electrical Traction in the museum's facilities in Vilanova.

The museum's collection comprises more than sixty vehicles from all periods of history, diverse countries of origin and different technologies, including 28 steam locomotives from the late 19th century and a copy of the first steam locomotive used in the Iberian Peninsula, still used in demonstrations on the first Sunday of the month. The collection also includes diesel and electric locomotives, coaches, a Bogie type Harlan, a signal bridge, and an original interlocking lever frame table used in the Barcelona central railway station.

The museum's library contains more than 6,100 volumes in its catalog, including works on trains and vehicles, rail traffic documentation, history and legislation, statistics, and infrastructure. The library also houses 400 video recordings and 10,000 photographs.

Locomotives

Image Gallery

See also
 List of museums in Catalonia

References

External link

Transport museums in Catalonia
Railway museums in Spain
Vilanova i la Geltrú